Flash Best is the first compilation album by the Japanese electronica band Capsule. The limited release first press also included a DVD with music videos of "Flash Back", "Jumper",　"Sugarless Girl", "Glider", "Portable Airport",　"Space Station No.9" and　"Soratobu Toshikeikaku".

Track listing

Capsule (band) compilation albums
2009 compilation albums